Corscia is a commune in the Haute-Corse department of France on the island of Corsica.
It contains the Corscia hydroelectric power station, which is fed by water channeled from Lac de Calacuccia and discharges into the Barrage de Corscia.

Population

See also
Communes of the Haute-Corse department

References

Communes of Haute-Corse
Haute-Corse communes articles needing translation from French Wikipedia